Harvey St Clair (born 13 November  1998) is a professional footballer who plays as a winger for Italian  club Vis Pesaro. He has represented Scotland at youth level.

Club career
St Clair joined Chelsea as an 8-year-old, and played for their under-18 team when he was 15. After 12 years at the club, he turned down a new contract and instead signed for four years at Serie B side Venezia in June 2018.

On 23 August 2018, St Clair made his senior debut for Venezia in the Coppa Italia, starting in the 1–0 home loss to Serie C side Südtirol. After injury ruled him out of the opening weeks of the season, St Clair made his Serie B debut on 30 October as an 88th-minute substitute for Francesco Di Mariano in a 1–0 away win over Cremonese. He made his first Serie B start on 30 March 2019 in a 1–1 draw away to Salernitana.

On 2 September 2019, St Clair signed for Scottish Premiership club Kilmarnock on a season-long loan. He made his debut twenty days later in a 3–1 loss at holders Celtic, as a 72nd-minute substitute for Liam Millar.

On 31 January 2022, St Clair joined Triestina on loan.

On 27 January 2023, St Clair moved to Vis Pesaro in Serie C and signed a contract until the end of the season.

International career
Born and raised in London, St Clair qualified for Scotland through his mother, Heather, coming from Edinburgh. He made his debut for the under-17 team in their European qualifier against the Faroe Islands. This was at Eamonn Deacy Park in Galway, Ireland on 22 September 2014 and scored in a 4–0 win before a crowd of 25 people in a 'tornado'. In March 2018, he was first called up to the under-21 team. In June that year at the 2018 Toulon Tournament the Scots came fourth, with St Clair winning a penalty in the third-place match against Turkey, which was saved by Altay Bayındır.

Career statistics

References

External links
Harvey St Clair at Scottish Football Association

1998 births
Living people
Footballers from Kingston upon Thames
English people of Scottish descent
Scottish footballers
English footballers
Association football midfielders
Chelsea F.C. players
Serie B players
Serie C players
Venezia F.C. players
U.S. 1913 Seregno Calcio players
U.S. Triestina Calcio 1918 players
Scottish Professional Football League players
Kilmarnock F.C. players
Vis Pesaro dal 1898 players
Scottish expatriate footballers
Scottish expatriate sportspeople in Italy
Expatriate footballers in Italy
Scotland youth international footballers